The Icabod Bradley House is a historic building at 537 Shuttle Meadow Road in Southington, Connecticut.  Built in 1813, it is a good local example of transitional Colonial-Federal architecture.  It was listed on the National Register of Historic Places in 1989.

Description and history
The Ichabod Bradley House stands in a rural-residential area of northeastern Southington, on the north side of Shuttle Meadow Road just west of the Plainville Reservoir.  It is a -story wood-frame structure, with a side-gable roof, center chimney, and clapboarded exterior.  Its main facade faces south, and is five bays wide.  The ground-floor windows are topped by shallow cornices, while the second-floor windows butt against the eave.  The main entrance is at the center, with flanking narrow fluted pilasters, and a half-round fanlight transom above, topped by a dentillated cap.  The building corners also exhibit pilasters. A single-story addition extends the building to the rear, and the  property also includes a shed and garage, both from the 20th century.

The house is believed to have been built about 1813 by Ichabod Bradley, a successful farmer in northeastern Southington.  The basic plan of the house is Colonial in style, but the door surround and other trim elements are distinctly Federal in style.  Bradley was the father of Amon Bradley, a leading figure of civic and business leadership in Southington in the mid-19th century.

See also
National Register of Historic Places listings in Southington, Connecticut

References

Houses on the National Register of Historic Places in Connecticut
Colonial architecture in the United States
Federal architecture in Connecticut
Houses completed in 1813
Houses in Southington, Connecticut
National Register of Historic Places in Hartford County, Connecticut